Irina Sergeyevna Bogatyryova (born December 15, 1982, in Kazan) is a Russian prose writer. She is the author of seven books.

Irina grew up in Ulyanovsk. She graduated from Moscow Literature Institute in 2005.
She also graduated from the Russian State University for the Humanities.

She is a Oktyabr magazine award winner (2007).

She is a Novy Mir magazine award winner (2020).

Bogatyryova now lives in Moscow.

She is the author of "Кадын" and of "Ведяна".

References

1982 births
Living people
21st-century Russian women writers
Maxim Gorky Literature Institute alumni
Russian State University for the Humanities alumni